Vlastimil Melich (7 April 1928 in Vysoké nad Jizerou – 2 August 1978) was a Czechoslovakian Nordic skier who competed in the 1950s. At the 1952 Winter Olympics, he finished 16th in the Nordic combined event, 29th in the 18 km cross-country skiing event, and eighth in the 4 × 10 km cross country skiing relay.

Melich competed at the 1956 Winter Olympics, where he was eight in the 4 × 10 cross-country relay and 18th in the Nordic combined, and 1960 Winter Olympics, where he again finished 18th in the Nordic combined event.

References

External links
 Olympic cross country skiing 18 km results: 1948–1952
 Olympic 4 × 10 km relay results: 1936–2002 
 Olympic nordic combined results: 1948–1964

1928 births
1978 deaths
Czech male cross-country skiers
Czech male Nordic combined skiers
Czechoslovak male cross-country skiers
Czechoslovak male Nordic combined skiers
Olympic cross-country skiers of Czechoslovakia
Olympic Nordic combined skiers of Czechoslovakia
Cross-country skiers at the 1952 Winter Olympics
Nordic combined skiers at the 1952 Winter Olympics
Cross-country skiers at the 1956 Winter Olympics
Nordic combined skiers at the 1956 Winter Olympics
Nordic combined skiers at the 1960 Winter Olympics
People from Vysoké nad Jizerou
Sportspeople from the Liberec Region